Scenario Pack A1: Operation Morpheus is a 1981 role-playing game adventure for Aftermath! published by Fantasy Games Unlimited.

Plot summary
Operation Morpheus is a scenario for beginning player characters in which the heroes wake up from cryogenic sleep into the postholocaust world.

Operation Morpheus is the second scenario pack for Aftermath, and contains not only complete background information for an entire campaign setting, but holds additional supplemental materials of use with the game system as well.

Publication history
Operation Morpheus was written by Phil McGregor, with art by Bob Charrette, and was published in 1982 by Fantasy Games Unlimited as a 56-page book.  Sydney: The Wilderness Campaign is the sequel.

Reception
Chris Baylis reviewed Operation Morpheus for Imagine magazine, and stated that "If you have the rules to Aftermath, and you enjoy the game, I suggest that you take yourself off to your nearest stockist, and invest in Operation Morpheus, you, or your players, won't regret it. (Well maybe the dead ones will – a little!!!)" 

William A. Barton reviewed Operation Morpheus in Space Gamer No. 65. Barton commented that "if you're an Aftermath enthusiast, you won't want to pass this one up. It is an outstanding addition to that game system."

References

Aftermath!
Role-playing game supplements introduced in 1981
Science fiction role-playing game adventures